The Battle of Khoy  may refer to; 

Battle of Khoy (1467) - Between Uzun Hassan of Aq Qoyunlu & Jahan Shah of Kara Koyunlu
Battle of Khoy (1478) - Between Sultan Khalil bin Uzun Hasan of Aq Qoyunlu & Generals Bayandur Beg and Sulayman Beg of Yaqub bin Uzun Hasan of Aq Qoyunlu (Succession Crisis) 

See: Khoy#History